Irhab is a village in northern Syria, administratively part of the Mount Simeon District of the Aleppo Governorate, located west of Aleppo. According to the Syria Central Bureau of Statistics (CBS), it had a population of 110 in the 2004 census.

References

Populated places in Mount Simeon District
Towns in Aleppo Governorate